Christ Church Cathedral is an Anglican cathedral in upper Trafalgar Street, Nelson, New Zealand with seating for 350 people. It is 58 metres in length and 27 metres wide. The tower is 35 metres high.

History

The original church was erected in 1851 at a different site, and enlarged in 1859. In 1866 the church was named as Christ Church Cathedral and enlarged again. In 1887 a second church was constructed at the current site using much of the same materials of the previous cathedral.

In 1925 the current church construction began. Construction was finished in 1965. The majority of marble was sourced from the Pakikiruna Range, near Tākaka. When construction started the marble was to be used in blocks. However, after the 1929 Murchison earthquake this was deemed too risky and far too expensive. The marble was then ground down and mixed with plaster to give the unusual appearance and colour.

The steps are constructed from granite. This granite was obtained from Tonga Beach, which is now part of Abel Tasman National Park. There is now a monument that overlooks Trafalgar Street and celebrates 100 years of settlement in Nelson.

Organ
The church's first pipe organ was constructed by T.C. Lewis in London and shipped to Nelson in 1871. The organ was then rebuilt in 1932. After 30 years of use the organ was overhauled and now consists of 2500 pipes. The organ is spread over three manuals and pedals and has a detached electric-action console situated on a gallery opposite the pipes in the chancel.

References

External links

 Nelson Cathedral Website

Nelson
Buildings and structures in Nelson, New Zealand
Tourist attractions in the Nelson Region
Terminating vistas in New Zealand
1960s architecture in New Zealand